The 2021–22 season was FC Sheriff Tiraspol's 25th season, and their 24th in the Divizia Naţională, the top-flight of Moldovan football. Sheriff are defending Divizia Naţională champions and will also take part in the Moldovan Cup, as well as entering the UEFA Champions League in the first qualifying round.

Season events
On 18 June, Sheriff Tiraspol announced the loan signing of Giorgos Athanasiadis from AEK Athens.

On 29 June, Sheriff Tiraspol announced the signing of Hansel Zapata from La Equidad. Two days later, 1 July, Sheriff Tiraspol announced the return of Henrique Luvannor, and the signing of Momo Yansané.

On 14 July, Sheriff Tiraspol announced the signing of Edmund Addo from Senica.

On 29 July, Sheriff Tiraspol announced the permanent signing of Dimitris Kolovos after he'd spent the 2020–21 season on loan at the club.

On 20 August, Sheriff Tiraspol announced the signing of Boban Nikolov on a free transfer after he'd left Lecce, and the signing of Bruno from Aris Thessaloniki.

On 29 August, Henrique Luvannor left Sheriff Tiraspol to sign for Al Taawoun, whilst Jasurbek Yakhshiboev joined the club the following day on loan from Legia Warsaw.

On 13 September, Sheriff Tiraspol announced the signing of Stefanos Evangelou on a free transfer after he'd previously played for Górnik Zabrze.

On 16 September, Sheriff Tiraspol announced the signing of Abdoul Moumouni from US GN, with Basit Khalid joining on a free transfer the following day after he'd previously played for Espérance Tunis.

On 24 December, Sheriff Tiraspol announced that Head Coach Yuriy Vernydub had signed a new contract with the club until the end of 2024.

On 14 January, Sheriff Tiraspol announced that Cristiano had been sold to Fluminense, whilst Danilo Arboleda, Frank Castañeda, Nadrey Dago and Dušan Marković had all left the club. The following day, 15 January, Sheriff Tiraspol announced the signing of Pernambuco on loan from Lviv until the end of the season with an option to make the move permanent.

On 17 January, Sheriff Tiraspol announced the signing of Patrick Kpozo from Östersunds. Four days later, 21 January, Sheriff Tiraspol announced the signing of fellow Ghanaian international Razak Abalora from Asante Kotoko.

On 26 January, Sheriff Tiraspol announced the signing of Gaby Kiki from Rukh Brest and Renan Guedes from Bahia.

On 30 January, Krylia Sovetov announced the signing of Fernando from Sheriff Tiraspol.

On 2 February, Sheriff Tiraspol announced the signing of Regi Lushkja from Laçi and the departure of Dimitris Kolovos to Kocaelispor.

On 9 February, Sheriff Tiraspol announced the signing of Cedric Badolo on loan from Pohronie.

On 16 February, Sheriff Tiraspol announced the signing of Danil Ankudinov on loan from Rodina Moscow.

Following Sheriff Tiraspol's 2–0 defeat to Braga in the Knockout round play-off of the UEFA Europa League, Head Coach Yuriy Vernydub left his position to join the Armed Forces of Ukraine in response to Russia's invasion of Ukraine that began on the 24th February 2022.

Squad

Out on loan

Transfers

In

Loans in

Out

Loans out

Released

Friendlies

Competitions

Overall record

Divizia Națională

League table

Results summary

Results

Moldovan Cup

Final

Super Cup

UEFA Champions League

First qualifying round

Second qualifying round

Third qualifying round

Play-off round

Group stage

UEFA Europa League

Knockout round play-off

Squad statistics

Appearances and goals

|-
|colspan="16"|Players away on loan:

|-
|colspan="16"|Players who left Sheriff Tiraspol during the season:

|}

Goal scorers

Clean sheets

Disciplinary Record

References

External links 
 

FC Sheriff Tiraspol seasons
Sheriff Tiraspol
Sheriff Tiraspol
Moldovan football clubs 2021–22 season